Milutin Đukanović (born 20 July 1991) is a Montenegrin professional basketball player for BK Olomoucko of the Czech National Basketball League.

Đukanović played for Budućnost, HKK Zrinjski, BK Opava, Lovćen Cetinje, Türk Telekom, KK Metalac Valjevo, KTE-Duna Aszfalt and Spars Sarajevo. He played for Lovćen 1947 of the Montenegrin Basketball League and the Adriatic Second League from 2018 to 2021. Đukanović signed with BK Olomoucko on 2 December 2021.

References

1991 births
Living people
BK Opava players
Kecskeméti TE (basketball) players
KK Budućnost players
KK Lovćen players
KK Metalac Valjevo players
Montenegrin expatriate basketball people in Hungary
Montenegrin expatriate basketball people in Serbia
Montenegrin expatriate basketball people in Turkey
Montenegrin men's basketball players
OKK Spars players
Türk Telekom B.K. players
Shooting guards